Rémi Lamerat (born 14 January 1990) is a French rugby union player. His position is centre and he currently plays for Bordeaux Bègles in the Top 14. He began his career with Stade Toulousain before moving to Castres in 2012, then onto Clermont Auvergne in 2016, and then to Union Bordeaux Bègles in 2019.

References

1990 births
Living people
French rugby union players
Sportspeople from Gironde
Stade Toulousain players
Castres Olympique players
ASM Clermont Auvergne players
Union Bordeaux Bègles players
Rugby union centres
France international rugby union players